A.K.A. I-D-I-O-T is an EP by Swedish band The Hives, released in 1998.

The song "A.K.A. I-D-I-O-T" was first released as the second track on The Hives' first album, Barely Legal. It was released again on the compilation Your New Favourite Band, though not in its entirety, along with "Outsmarted", "Untutored Youth" and "Mad Man". "Numbers" is a cover of The Adicts' song from the album Songs of Praise and appeared only on the American pressing of the EP.

Music video
An unreleased music video was filmed in black-and-white and features the band performing this song in a recording studio. All of the band members, excluding Chris Dangerous, are wearing sunglasses. The strobe lights are flashing during the chorus of "A.K.A. I-D-I-O-T".

Track listing
"A.K.A. I-D-I-O-T"
"Outsmarted"
"Untutored Youth"
"Fever"
"Mad Man"
"Numbers"

References

External links

The Hives albums
1998 EPs
Burning Heart Records EPs